Joško Jeličić (born 5 January 1971) is a retired Croatian footballer who played as a midfielder. He had spells with Pohang Steelers in South Korea, GNK Dinamo Zagreb, Sevilla FC and Hajduk Split.

Club career
He has spent most of his career in the two biggest clubs in Croatia Hajduk Split and GNK Dinamo Zagreb .

International career
Jeličić made his debut for Croatia in a July 1992 friendly match away against Australia, getting himself sent off in the second half. It remained his sole international appearance.

Honours 
Hajduk Split
Yugoslav Cup (1): 1991
Croatian First League (1): 1992
Croatian Cup (1): 1993

Dinamo Zagreb
Croatian First League (4): 1992–93, 1997–98, 1998–99, 1999–2000
Croatian Cup (3): 1994, 1998, 2001

References

External links
 
 

1971 births
Living people
People from Solin
Association football midfielders
Yugoslav footballers
Croatian footballers
Croatia international footballers
HNK Hajduk Split players
GNK Dinamo Zagreb players
Sevilla FC players
Pohang Steelers players
NK Zagreb players
Yugoslav First League players
Croatian Football League players
La Liga players
K League 1 players
Croatian expatriate footballers
Expatriate footballers in Spain
Croatian expatriate sportspeople in Spain
Expatriate footballers in South Korea
Croatian expatriate sportspeople in South Korea